Hrímgerðr (also Hrimgerd or Hrimgerdr; Old Norse: , "frost-Gerðr") is a jötunn in Norse mythology.

Name 
The Old Norse name Hrímgerðr has been translated as 'frost-Gerðr'.

Attestation 
In Helgakviða Hjörvarðssonar, Hrímgerðr announces herself as the daughter of the jötunn Hati.

After the hero Helgi Hundingsbane kills her father, Hrímgerðr harasses him, and Atli Idmundsson engages her in a contest of flyting until she turns into stone in the sunrise.

Notes

References

Gýgjar